Flying G-Men is a 15-episode 1939 adventure film Film serial, directed by James W. Horne and Ray Taylor. The serial was the sixth of the 57 serials released by Columbia. Four "Flying G-Men" battle with enemy saboteurs intent on destroying American military defences.

Plot
Three government aviators, Hal Andrews (Robert Paige), Bart Davis (Richard Fiske) and John Cummings (James Craig) called the "Flying G-Men", one of whom is disguised as "The Black Falcon" (Robert Paige), fight to protect the United States and its allies from an enemy spy ring and to avenge the death of the fourth Flying G-Man, Charles Bronson (Stanley Brown).

Bronson was killed when he attempted to stop enemy agents from stealing the new McKay military aircraft, designed by Billy McKay (Sammy McKim). The Junior Air Defenders are also enlisted to help the Flying G-Men.

A plot to infiltrate all military factories and airports is discovered but the spy chief called "The Professor"(Forbes Murray) is unknown. Suspecting Marvin Brewster, the owner of Brewster  Airport, a local airfield, is The Professor, the G-Men find that he has kidnapped Babs McKay (Lorna Gray). They follow him to the spy hideout to capture Brewster and rescue Babs.

Chapter titles
 Challenge in the Sky
 Flight of the Condemned
 The Vulture's Nest
 The Falcon Strikes
 Flight from Death
 Phantom of the Sky
 Trapped by Radio
 The Midnight Watch
 Wings of Terror
 Flaming Wreckage
 While a Nation Sleeps
 Sealed Orders
 Flame Island
 Jaws of Death
 The Falcon's Reward
Source:

Cast

 Robert Paige as Hal Andrews, Flying G-Man, and "The Black Falcon"
 Richard Fiske as Bart Davis, Flying G-Man
 James Craig as John Cummings, Flying G-Man
 Lorna Gray as Babs McKay 
 Sammy McKim as Billy McKay
 Stanley Brown as Charles Bronson, Flying G-Man
 Don Beddoe as W. S. Hamilton
 Forbes Murray as Marvin Brewster and The Professor, the villainous owner of a local airport
 Lee Prather as Simmons
 Beatrice Blinn as Brewster's secretary
 Ann Doran as Hamilton's secretary
 Dick Curtis as Korman, a henchman
 Eddie Laughton as Hall, a henchman
 John Tyrrell as Williams
 Eddie Fetherston as Borden, a geologist

Production
Flying G-Men had the services of noted aerial stunt pilot and cinematographer Paul Mantz who flew a Lockheed Sirius and Ryan ST. Mantz was a prolific Hollywood "stunt" pilot, although he preferred to call himself a "precision pilot".

Reception
Film reviewer Jerry Blake in The Files of Jerry Blake described Flying G-Men' serial as, "... the least interesting of Columbia’s five in-house serial productions (the other four being 'Great Adventures of Wild Bill Hickok', 'The Spider's Web', 'Overland With Kit Carson', and 'Mandrake the Magician') ... its action scenes are uneven, its lead villains weak, and its plotting often disjointed. However, it remains watchable and enjoyable throughout, thanks to an extremely likeable group of heroes and an unfailingly fast pace."

According to many serial and comics historians, the Black Falcon character is a precursor to Blackhawk, including author William Schoell who said, "It is hard not to notice the resemblance between the Black Falcon and comic books' Blackhawk, but the latter character did not actually appear until 1941 [Republic did a serial version of Blackhawk in 1952], meaning the Black Falcon came first."

See also
 List of American films of 1939
List of film serials by year
List of film serials by studio

References
Notes

Citations

Bibliography

 Cline, William C. "Filmography". In the Nick of Time. Jefferson, North Carolina: McFarland & Company, Inc., 1984. .
 Farmer, James H. Celluloid Wings: The Impact of Movies on Aviation. Blue Ridge Summit, Pennsylvania: Tab Books Inc., 1984. .
 Rainey, Buck. Serials and Series: A World Filmography, 1912–1956. Jefferson, North Carolina: McFarland & Company, Inc., 2010. .
 Weiss, Ken and Ed Goodgold. To be Continued ...: A Complete Guide to Motion Picture Serials. New York: Bonanza Books, 1973. .
 Wynne, H. Hugh. The Motion Picture Stunt Pilots and Hollywood's Classic Aviation Movies.'' Missoula, Montana: Pictorial Histories Publishing Co., 1987. .

External links
 
 

1939 films
1930s English-language films
American black-and-white films
American aviation films
Columbia Pictures film serials
Films directed by James W. Horne
Films directed by Ray Taylor
American action adventure films
1930s action adventure films
1930s American films